Irina Buryachok and Nadiia Kichenok were the defending champions, but both players decided not to participate.

Chan Chin-wei and Xu Yifan won the title, defeating Sun Ziyue and Xu Shilin in the final, 7–6(7–4), 6–1.

Seeds

Draw

References 
 Draw

Blossom Cup - Doubles
Industrial Bank Cup